Matthew Cowles (September 28, 1944 – May 22, 2014) was an American actor and playwright.

Early life
The son of actor and theatre producer Chandler Cowles, he was born in New York City.

Career
In 1966 Cowles played the title role in Edward Albee's short-lived adaptation of James Purdy's comic novel Malcolm on Broadway at the Shubert Theatre.

In 1968, he appeared with Al Pacino and John Cazale in Israel Horovitz's The Indian Wants the Bronx.

In 1983, Cowles joined The Mirror Theater Ltd's Mirror Repertory Company for their first repertory season, performing in Paradise Lost, Rain, Inheritors, and The Hasty Heart.

Cowles' first television part was Joe Czernak in the series NYPD in 1969. He was nominated for a Daytime Emmy as Outstanding Actor in a Daytime Drama Series in 1978 and as Outstanding Supporting Actor in a Daytime Drama Series in 1981, both for his part as Billy Clyde Tuggle in All My Children, a role that he created and wrote.

Cowles' first film was the comedy drama Me, Natalie (1969) in which he played Harvey Belman. Al Pacino also made his debut in this film.

In 2010, Cowles played a supporting role in Martin Scorsese's film Shutter Island.

Cowles also starred in three short plays for the public radio show and podcast Playing on Air.

Personal life
In 1983, he married actress Christine Baranski with whom he had two daughters, Isabel (born 1984) and Lily (born 1987). In a New York Times profile of his wife, he was described as "the black sheep member of a family with ties to Cowles publishing and Drexel banking". 
He was an enthusiastic motorcycle rider.

Cowles was a devout Catholic and taught religious education at the Church of the Nativity.

Death
Matthew Cowles died from congestive heart failure on May 22, 2014.

Filmography

Film
Me, Natalie (1969) as Harvey Belman
The Friends of Eddie Coyle (1973) as Pete
The Happy Hooker (1975) as Albert Ruffleson
Slap Shot (1977) as Charlie
The World According to Garp (1982) as O. Fecteau
Eddie Macon's Run (1983) as Ray Banes
The Money Pit (1986) as Marty
Stars and Bars (1988) as Beckman Gage
White Fang 2: Myth of the White Wolf (1994) as Lloyd Halverson
The Cowboy Way (1994) as Popfly
The Juror (1996) as Rodney
Nurse Betty (2000) as Merle
Shutter Island (2010) as Ferry Boat Captain

Television
All My Children (1977–1980, 1984, 1989–1990, 2011 ) as Billy Clyde Tuggle
As the World Turns (1983) as Lonnie
Love on the Run (1985) as Yancy
Loving (1986–1987) as Eban Japes
Lonesome Dove (1989) as Monkey John
Asylum, a 1991 episode of Law & Order as Christian 'Lemonhead' Tatum
The Bold and the Beautiful (1997) as Curtis Love
Oz (2003) as Willy Brandt
Life on Mars (2008–2009) as Cowboy Dan
Law & Order: Special Victims Unit (2007 Season 9 episode 15) as Cyrus Wert

Stage credits
Malcolm (1966) Broadway as Malcolm.
The Indian Wants the Bronx (1968), Astor Place Theatre
The Time of Your Life (1969) as Dudley
Sweet Bird of Youth (1975–1976) as Tom Junior
Dirty Jokes (1976) at the Academy Festival Theatre in Chicago, Illinois

Bibliography

Plays
Mexican Standoff at Fat Squaw Springs
Our Daily Bread
Noblesse Oblige

References

External links

1944 births
American male film actors
American male stage actors
American male television actors
American Roman Catholics
2014 deaths
20th-century American male actors
Male actors from New York City
21st-century American male actors
Writers from New York City
20th-century American dramatists and playwrights